The starry toado (Arothron firmamentum) is a pufferfish of the family Tetraodontidae, found in subtropical oceans worldwide, at depths between 10 and 360 m.  Its length is up to 40 cm.

References

 
 Tony Ayling & Geoffrey Cox, Collins Guide to the Sea Fishes of New Zealand,  (William Collins Publishers Ltd, Auckland, New Zealand 1982) 

Arothron
Fish described in 1850
Marine fish of New Zealand